Shah Najaf (also Romanized as Shāh Najaf and Shāh-e Najaf) is a village in Poshtkuh Rural District of Falard District, Lordegan County, Chaharmahal and Bakhtiari province, Iran. At the 2006 census, its population was 779 in 179 households. The following census in 2011 counted 1,277 people in 305 households. The latest census in 2016 showed a population of 1,131 people in 307 households; it was the largest village in its rural district.

References 

Lordegan County

Populated places in Chaharmahal and Bakhtiari Province

Populated places in Lordegan County